Francis I, Charles V and the Duchess of Étampes is a c.1827 history painting by Richard Parkes Bonington, now in the Louvre in Paris. It shows Charles V, Holy Roman Emperor, Francis I of France and Anne de Pisseleu d'Heilly. It was lent to the Musée des beaux-arts de Lyon for its 2014 exhibition L'invention du Passé. Histoires de cœur et d'épée 1802-1850..

History paintings
1827 paintings
Paintings in the Louvre by American and British artists
Cultural depictions of Charles V, Holy Roman Emperor
Cultural depictions of Francis I of France